The discography of 2Cellos, a Croatian cello duo, consists of five studio albums, one extended play (EP) and one video album.

Albums

Studio albums

Extended plays

Video albums

Music videos

Notes

References

External links
 Official website
 2Cellos at AllMusic
 2Cellos at Billboard

Classical music discographies
Discographies of Croatian artists
Rock music discographies